Time Within Time: The Diaries 1970–1986 (Original Russian title: Martyrolog) are the diaries of the Russian filmmaker Andrei Tarkovsky. They cover his life and work in the Soviet Union and the time of his exile in Western Europe. After the 1991 coup several memos surfaced that alleged that the KGB had at times access to the diaries. Although Tarkovsky did not openly oppose the Soviet system, his work heavily emphasized spiritual themes, that were at conflict with the official anti-religious atheist ideology, prompting the KGB to open a file on him.

The Diaries

Tarkovsky called his diaries Martyrolog (Translated by Tarkovsky's official English translator Kitty Hunter-Blair as Martyrology). He said about this title in 1974: "Pretentious and false as a title, but let it stay as a reminder of my ineradicable, futile worthlessness." The diaries are deeply personal and were intended mainly for Tarkovsky himself. They cover his life and work in the Soviet Union and during the time of his exile. Sometimes entries are seemingly trivial, as for example shopping lists or entries on his health. Another frequent topic are other film directors or artists, which Tarkovsky generally regarded with a negative attitude. At other times, Tarkovsky discusses philosophical or film theoretical questions, not necessarily related to day-to-day events. Tarkovsky kept his diary until shortly before his death on December 29, 1986. The last entry was on December 15, 1986. His last words were "But now I have no strength left – that is the problem".

Editorial history

The diaries have been translated from its Russian original into 15 different languages, sometimes with significant differences. The diaries were first published in 1989 in German. The first English edition was published in 1991, translated by Kitty Hunter-Blair, who also translated Sculpting in Time. This edition is also known as the Calcutta edition as it was published first in India. The Russian original was not officially published until 2008. Other notable translations include the French and the Polish edition, which both are among the most complete editions of the diaries. Other translations include the Czech, Italian, Japanese and Mongolian editions of the diaries.

References

External links
 The Diaries at www.nostalghia.com

1991 non-fiction books
Andrei Tarkovsky
Academic works about film theory
Diaries
Show business memoirs
Books published posthumously
Seagull Books books